Encounter is an American science fiction film starring Luke Hemsworth, Anna Hutchison, Tom Atkins, Glenn Keogh, Vincent M. Ward, Cheryl Texiera and Christopher Showerman, and is written and directed by Paul J. Salamoff.

Synopsis
A group of friends make a remarkable discovery in a rural field: a crashed spacecraft. Then they discover that there was a survivor. They bring the otherworldly being back to their home, but they soon discover that it holds even greater secrets than they could imagine. But as government agents start to show rising interest in the event, time is running out to ascertain the alien's true intentions.

Cast
 Luke Hemsworth as Will Dawkins
 Anna Hutchison as Jessica Dawkins
 Cheryl Texiera as Teresa Fleming
 Tom Atkins as Professor Westlake
 Christopher Showerman as Jonathan Brandt
 Vincent M. Ward as Marcus Doyle
 Glenn Keogh as Brent Fleming
 Wendy Davis as Agent Tevis
 Peter Holden as Agent Banks
 Kenny Barr as Agent Strugatsky
 TJ Jackson as Agent Lem
 Sarah Booth as Rachel
 Susan Willis as Professor Westlake's Wife
 Tweed Michael Manning as Professor Westlake's Father
 Shannon Edwards as Hospital Patient
 Catherine Jerald as Professor Westlake's Mother
 Callie Eckley as Shannon (as Callie Marie Eckley)
 Don Kittilson as SWAT Team Member
 David Sward as SWAT Team Member, Special Agent

Production
In April 2017, filming began in and around Augusta, Georgia. Director Paul J. Salamoff chose to direct in Augusta as he had a prior favorable opinion of the city, stating that it had "not only great tax incentives, but also a great crew base". Landmarks in the film included Paine College. Salamoff also stated that "“The world of ‘Encounter’ is a nod back to classic sci-fi movies of the ’70s and ’80s".

Actor Luke Hemsworth was announced as the film's lead. Other actors that were brought in included Anna Hutchison and Tom Atkins. Glenn Keogh was brought on to replace another actor shortly before filming began, due to issues with the actor's work visa. Coincidentally, Anna Hutchinson played the girlfriend of a character played by Luke Hemsworth's younger brother, Chris Hemsworth, in her second film, The Cabin in the Woods.

Release 
Encounter premiered on December 9, 2018 at the Other Worlds Austin film festival. This was followed by a release to VOD on October 1, 2019.

Reception 
Encounter received reviews from Flickering Myth and Film Threat, both of which heavily criticized the movie's plot, editing, and special effects. Film critic Jackie K. Cooper was more favorable, writing that "It looks like your run of the mill sci-fi adventure - but it's not. Luke Hemsworth underplays his part and is that much more effective. Plus the movie has just enough of a twist to keep you watching every scene for clues as to what is going on."

References

External links
 
 

2018 films
American science fiction films
Films set in the 21st century
Films shot in Georgia (U.S. state)
2010s English-language films
2010s American films